Julian Baumgartner (born 27 July 1994) is an Austrian footballer who plays for the reserve team of SV Ried.

Career

Club career
Baumgartner began his career at Union Mehrnbach in Upper Austria. In 2004 he was signed by SV Ried and stayed in their youth department until 2012. After good performances in the youth teams, he was promoted into the first team by interim coach Gerhard Schweitzer. He made his debut in the Austrian Football Bundesliga on 5 May 2012 against the later relegated Kapfenberger SV when he came on in the 84th minute for Marco Meilinger. He was used one more time in the Bundesliga in that season.

For the 2016/17 season he moved to Austrian Landesliga club SV Wallern. After two seasons at Wallern, Baumgartner moved to WSC Hertha Wels in the summer 2018.

In the following season, he played for SV Grieskirchen, before returning to SV Ried, where he was registered for the clubs reserve team.

References

External links
 
 Julian Baumgartner at ÖFB

Austrian footballers
Austrian Football Bundesliga players
Austrian Regionalliga players
SV Ried players
1994 births
Living people
Association football midfielders